"Gomen-nasai" is a 1951 song with music by Raymond Hattori, a Japanese conductor and musical director for Nippon Columbia, and lyrics by Benedict Mayers a Roosevelt University professor serving in the U.S. Army.

It became a hit first in Japan then in America when Richard Bowers, a U.Sm Army GI stationed in the Far East during 1952, took part in a Tokyo recording session for Colombia with the Columbia Tokyo Orchestra. Bowers sang the song again in character as a US G.I. in the 1953 film Mission Over Korea.

Eri Chiemi, who would later become part of Sannin Musume (Three Girls) trio along with Misora Hibari and Yukimura Izumi, toured the United States in 1953 appearing in a charity concert with the Harry James Orchestra in Los Angeles, and recorded  “Gomen nasai” on Federal (catalog no. 12140; Vinyl 7") with as featured performers an anonymous "GI Joe" as guest vocals. Eddy Howard and his Orchestra also recorded the song, reaching No.17 in the US charts. The song was also recorded successfully as a single by Harry Belafonte.

References

1951 songs
1953 singles
Harry Belafonte songs
Eddy Howard songs